Little Miss Sunshine received numerous awards and honors from film organizations, film festivals, and critics groups. The 2006 film was commended for its ensemble cast, individual roles, screenplay, and other aspects of the film.

Organizations

Film festivals

Critics groups

References

External links
 

Lists of accolades by film